Operations Research is a bimonthly peer-reviewed academic journal covering operations research that is published by the Institute for Operations Research and the Management Sciences. It was established in 1952 as the Journal of the Operations Research Society of America and obtained its current name in 1955. The editor-in-chief is John Birge (University of Chicago).

Abstracting and indexing
The journal is abstracted and indexed by Mathematical Reviews, MathSciNet, Science Citation Index Expanded, Scopus, Social Sciences Citation Index, and Zentralblatt MATH. According to the Journal Citation Reports, the journal has a 2018 impact factor of 2.604.

References

External links

Mathematics journals
Publications established in 1952
English-language journals
INFORMS academic journals
Bimonthly journals
Business and management journals